Arcadia Biosciences is a publicly traded American agricultural biotechnology headquartered in Davis, California focused on the development of traits to enhance crop quality and productivity. The company is partly owned by Moral Compass Corporation.

It has developed a reduced-gluten and enhanced starch variety of wheat under the name GoodWheat. Arcadia also has a joint venture with Bioceres called Verdeca, which has developed and is commercializing HB4 technology in soybeans that gained FDA approval in 2017. HB4 soybeans have increased yield up to 30% while being more resistant to abiotic stress such as drought.

References

External links

Biotechnology companies of the United States
Life sciences industry
Biotechnology companies established in 2002
Genetic engineering and agriculture
Agriculture companies of the United States
Companies based in Yolo County, California
2002 establishments in California